The 2018 Campeonato Nacional de Velocidade Turismos is set to be the fourth season of Campeonato Nacional de Velocidade Turismos (en: Portuguese Touring Car Championship) that will run under the TCR regulations. The series is organised by the Federação Portuguesa de Automobilismo e Karting (FPAK) and Full Eventos under the Racing Weekend banner. Francisco Mora is the defending drivers' champion.

Teams and drivers
Yokohama is the official tire supplier. All teams and drivers are Portuguese based

Calendar and results 
The original version of the calendar, which included 5 stages, was changed on April 4 due to the need for teams of more time to prepare for participation in the new season. All events will be held in Portugal. For works in the Estoril circuit, the Federação Portuguesa de Automobilismo e Karting, together with the promoter of the event, opted for the change of the 4th stage for the Braga circuit.

Drivers' standings

References

External links 
 

CNV
Campeonato Nacional de Velocidade Turismos